The 1990 ABC Under-18 Championship was the eleventh edition of the Asian Championship for Junior Women. The tournament took place in Nagoya, Japan from 25 August to 2 September 1990.

 won their sixth championship after defeating  80–78 in the final.

Preliminary round

Draw

 Group X: China, Taiwan, India, Sri Lanka, Hong Kong
 Group Y: South Korea, Japan, Thai, Malaysia, Indonesia

Group X

Group Y

Final round

Semi-final

3rd-place game

Final

Awards

See also
 1990 ABC Under-18 Championship

References

FIBA Asia Under-18 Championship for Women
ABC Under-18 Championship for Women
ABC Under-18 Championship for Women
International basketball competitions hosted by Japan
ABC Under-18 Championship for Women
ABC Under-18 Championship for Women